Altafulla is a municipality in the comarca of the Tarragonès in Catalonia, Spain. The town of Altafulla has a beautifully intact old quarter crowned by the Castle of Altafulla, and an old fishing quarter dating back to the 18th century along the beach, called "Baixamar" or "Les Botigues de Mar".

An additional medieval castle on a small promontory overlooking the sea, the Castle of the Marquises of Tamarit (not open to the public) is often thought as part of Altafulla, but it's actually located in the neighbor municipality of Tarragona. Beyond the castle is one of the last remaining forests stretching along the sea in Catalonia, part of which is a small nature preserve (under the Tamarit-Punta de la Móra Special Environmental and Landscape Protection Plan).

Altafulla is also home to the remains of the Roman Villa of Els Munts, which is included in a larger UNESCO World Heritage Site The Gaià River "empties" into the sea here, its last stretch being a small nature preserve and haven for songbirds (Reserva Natural de Fauna Salvatge de la Desembocadura del Gaià - Gaià River Estuary Wildlife Preserve), though due to damming upriver, it carries very little water at this last section, forming a tiny salt marsh separated from the sea by a bar of sand. This wildlife preserve is run by L'Hort de la Sínia, an ecological agriculture, learning and activities center.

Altafulla has one of the highest median household incomes in the province of Tarragona.

Twin towns
 Roviano, Italy

References

 Panareda Clopés, Josep Maria; Rios Calvet, Jaume; Rabella Vives, Josep Maria (1989). Guia de Catalunya, Barcelona: Caixa de Catalunya.   (Catalan).  (Spanish).

External links 
 Altafulla – On the route of the castles in Camp de Tarragona region – part I., in Catalonia, Spain (in English)
 Altafulla – The town of thousand magic gates on Costa Daurada, in Catalonia, Spain (in English)
 Altafulla Tourism Page (in English, Catalan, Spanish, etc.)
 Altafulla on the website "Pobles de Catalunya. Guia del patrimoni històric i artístic dels municipis catalans" (Towns of Catalonia: Guide to the Historic and Artistic Heritage of Catalan Municipalities), (in Catalan)
 Government data pages 
Héctor Casilla (2004)

Municipalities in Tarragonès
Populated places in Tarragonès